Pyo Seung-Ju (born ) is a South Korean volleyball player. She is part of the South Korea women's national volleyball team.

She participated in the 2014 FIVB Volleyball World Grand Prix.
On club level she played for GS Caltex in 2014.

References

External links
 Profile at FIVB.org
Club Profile IBK Altos (in Korean)

1992 births
Living people
South Korean women's volleyball players
Place of birth missing (living people)
Volleyball players at the 2020 Summer Olympics
Olympic volleyball players of South Korea
Sportspeople from Ulsan